R136c is a star located in R136, a tight knot of stars at the centre of NGC 2070, an open cluster weighing 450,000 solar masses and containing 10,000 stars. It was first resolved and named by Feitzinger in 1980, along with R136a and R136b.

Description 
The extreme luminosity is produced by the CNO fusion process in its highly compressed hot core. It is strongly suspected to be a binary, due to the detection of hard x-ray emission typical of colliding wind binaries, but the companion is thought to make only a small contribution to the total luminosity.

Evolution 
R136c is so energetic that it has already lost a substantial fraction of its initial mass,  even though it is only a few million years old. It is still effectively on the main sequence, fusing hydrogen at its core via the CNO cycle, but it has convected and mixed fusion products to the surface and these create a powerful stellar wind and emission spectrum normally only seen in highly evolved stars.

Its fate depends on the amount of mass it loses before its core collapses, but is likely to result in a supernova. The most recent models for single star evolution at near-solar metallicities suggest that the most massive stars explode as highly stripped type Ic supernovae, although different outcomes are possible for binaries. Some of these supernovae are expected to produce a type of gamma-ray burst and the expected remnant is a black hole.

References

Stars in the Large Magellanic Cloud
Tarantula Nebula
Wolf–Rayet stars
Extragalactic stars
?
Dorado (constellation)
Large Magellanic Cloud